The Republic of Paraguay is a mostly bilingual country, as the majority of the population uses Spanish and Guaraní. The Constitution of Paraguay of 1992 declares it as a multicultural and bilingual country, establishing Spanish and Guaraní as official languages. Spanish, an Indo-European language of the Romance branch, is understood by about 90% of the population as a first or second language. Guaraní, an indigenous language of the Tupian family, is understood by 77%, and its use is regulated by the Academy of the Guaraní Language.

According to Instituto Cervantes' 2020 report, "El Español: Una lengua viva", 68.2% of the Paraguayan population (4,946,322 inhabitants) has decent mastery of the Spanish language. The remaining 31.8% (2,306,350 inhabitants) belongs to the Group of Limited Competence, having minimal mastery of the language; the majority of them are Guaraní speakers and speak Spanish as a second language. Only 7.93% are monolingual in Guaraní and do not understand Spanish, a figure that has gone down in the last thirty years.

The most distinct characteristic of Paraguayan culture is the persistence of Spanish alongside Guaraní, these being the official languages of the nation. The pidgin form of these languages is known as Jopara (with emphasis on the final syllable). For this reason, the country is often cited as one of the few countries in the world that is officially bilingual. Besides Spanish and Guaraní, there are another 19 languages of indigenous origin that are spoken by about 50,000 indigenous Paraguayans. Portuguese is also spoken by some 650,000 "Brasiguayos", the majority of whom are located near the border with Brazil. Other minority languages are German, Italian, Ukrainian, Japanese, Chinese, Arabic, etc.

According to data in the National Census of Population and Housing of the year 2012, carried out by the Dirección General de Estadísticas, Encuestas y Censos (today Instituto Nacional de Estadística), the most spoken languages in Paraguayan homes are: 46.3% Spanish and Guaraní (or Jopara), 34% only Guaraní, and 15.3% only Spanish; the rest speak other languages. The departments with the highest rate of domestic Guaraní speakers, according to EPH 2017, are: San Pedro (78.87%), Caazapá (77.39%), and Concepción (71.34%), while the places that Guaraní is spoken the least include: Asunción (8.95%), Central (15.9%), and Alto Paraná (37.75%). Spanish predominates in these last few departments. 
Guaraní is the only indigenous language of the Americas whose speakers include a large proportion of non-indigenous people. This is an anomaly in the Americas where language shift towards European colonial languages (in this case, the other official language of Spanish) has otherwise been a nearly universal cultural and identity marker of mestizos (people of mixed Spanish and Amerindian ancestry), and also of culturally assimilated, upwardly-mobile Amerindian people.

Linguistic Situation
Historically, Guarani was the dominant language in the region of modern day Paraguay and surrounding countries (Northern Argentina, Southwest Brazil, Southeast Bolivia, and Northern Uruguay). Upon arrival of Conquistadors in Paraguay, Castilian Spanish was introduced, but they never really created nor maintained a relevant community of speakers in the area. This was due to little flow of European migrants and especially due to geographic, political, and economic isolation of Paraguay in relation to its neighbors during that time period. In addition, mixed-race couples were encouraged by authorities in the colonial era, which was different from other countries at that time. This meant that Paraguayan families composed of a father of Spanish origin and a mother of Guarani origin were matriarchal; the kids would learn their mother’s language, which was Guarani.

Spanish speakers in Paraguay were always the minority relative to Guarani speakers, who were the majority. The majority of Spanish Speakers were Creole or children of immigrants. They were concentrated largely in the capital or in privileged classes toward the middle of the country where they had access to education. Guarani speakers were largely mixed-race or indigenous and came from rural areas. They comprised 90% of the population.
 
It was only recently toward the end of the 20th century and due to interventions that a notable and late Castellanización (“castillianization” - large inflow of Spanish language and thus large portion of the population becoming exposed to it) occurred in a large part of the population. This was largely due to the improvement of public education, the effects of urbanization, and access to new technology and modes of communication (like the television, the telephone, and the internet). A large portion of the population continued to speak Guarani which therefore caused the majority population to become bilingual. However, 21st century Paraguay has seen a decrease in the use of Guarani met by an increase in the use of Spanish. This phenomenon (castellanización) is similar to those observed by other countries in the Americas between the 19th and 20th centuries.

According to the 2012 census, between 2002 and 2012 the number of Guarani speakers in Paraguay decreased by 10% of the total population while the Spanish language increased its speakers (first and second language speakers). The use of Guarani fell from 86% (2002) to 77% (2012). Guarani-only speakers fell from 37% in 1992 to 27% in 2002 and dropped drastically to 8% in 2012. The use and comprehension of Spanish increased in the last fifty years, surpassing 50% of speakers (first and second language) during the mid-20th Century and reaching numbers up to 90% in the present day.

Official Languages
The majority of the population of Paraguay uses both languages (Spanish and Guarani). About 70% of the population is bilingual, speaking Spanish and Guarani at least to some degree. True bilingualism in which both languages are spoken equally is difficult in practice for many people. This is especially true in the interior parts of the country, where Guarani is the native language or predominant language. On the other hand, Spanish is the native language or predominant language for a large part of the population born in large urban areas.
In spite of the official ranking of Guarani in the country and the number of Guarani speakers, Spanish continues to be the dominant language in government affairs, official documents, judicial processes, administrative processes, professional affairs, business, media, and education (classes are given mainly in Spanish); Guarani is mainly used in colloquial settings, between family and friends. Due to this, there is diglossia and not exactly bilingualism in Paraguay.

Among bilingual people in the country, there is a preference to use Guarani in intimate, personal, and familiar situations. Language spoken also varies by rural and urban environments. For example, homes in Asunción and other big cities speak mainly in Spanish. In suburban areas of these big cities or in the interior of smaller cities, Guarani is mainly spoken. For reference, 37% of the population of Paraguay lives in rural zones.
 
In addition to an urban rural split, age of the speaker also contributes to the language spoken: mostly younger generations from urban areas speak Spanish; mostly younger people in rural areas and adults (born before 1980) from urban areas speak both languages equally. Adults from rural areas mainly speak Guarani. Socio-economic class does not correlate with language much. Some associate Spanish with more privileged classes, but the reality is that it is correlated only if the speaker speaks both languages. It is ultimately associated with urban vs. rural and/or generation (age) of the speaker.

Colloquially, they also use Yopara (jopará in Guarani) which is a mix of Spanish and Guarani; it is a linguistic phenomenon similar to Spanglish (a mix of Spanish and English) or Portuñol (mix of Spanish and Portuguese), among others. 46.3% of Paraguayan homes use Yopara, according to statistics from the 2012 DGEEC Census. The exact definition of Yopara differs in some ways according to different linguists: some define Yopara as “Spanish spoken in Guarani,” which was largely caused by criollizacion of Guarani and Spanish. For others, Yopara is a transition language for Guarani speakers who learn Paraguayan Spanish.

Indigenous languages
About 50,000 Paraguayans speak an indigenous language besides Guaraní:
 Aché language
 Angaité language
 Ava Guarani language
 Ayoreo language
 Chamacoco language
 Enlhet language
 Enxet language
 Iyoʼwujwa Chorote
 Kaskihá language
 Maká language
 Nivaclé language
 Pai Tavytera language
 Sanapaná language
 Toba-Maskoy language
 Toba Qom language

Besides Spanish, Guaraní, and all other previous languages, Portuguese, Plautdietsch, Standard German and Italian are spoken as well.

See also
 Demographics of Paraguay

References